A square is a regular quadrilateral with four equal sides and four right angles.

Square or Squares may also refer to:

Mathematics and science
Square (algebra), multiplying a number or expression by itself
Square (cipher), a cryptographic block cipher
Global square, a principle in infinitary combinatorics
Square number, an integer that is the square of another integer
Square of a graph
Square wave, a non-sinusoidal periodic waveform

Construction
Square (area), an Imperial unit of floor area and other construction materials
Square, a public meeting place:
Garden square, an open space with buildings surrounding a garden
Market square, an open area where market stalls are traditionally set out for trading
Town square, an open area commonly found in the heart of a traditional town used for community gatherings
Square (tool), an L- or T-shaped tool:
Combination square, a tool with a ruled blade and one or more interchangeable heads
Machinist square, a metalworking tool used to produce right angles
Steel square, also called a "framing" or "carpenter's" square, produces right angles
Try square, a woodworking tool for checking right angles
Quadrature (mathematics), the process of producing right angles (squaring)

Arts, entertainment, and media

Music
Square (album), an album by Buck 65
Square (band), a musical trio from Lincoln, Nebraska
Square (EP), an EP by Red Square Black
 "Square", a song by Mitski from Retired from Sad, New Career in Business
 "Squares", a song by That Handsome Devil from A City Dressed in Dynamite

Brands and enterprises
Block, Inc., an American financial services and digital payments company, formerly known as Square Inc.
Square (financial services), the payment system operated by Block, Inc.
Square (video game company), Japanese former video game company
Squares (crisps), British brand of crisps

Sports
Square, the area in the middle of a cricket outfield on which the primary playing surfaces, known as pitches or wickets, are positioned
Square leg, a fielding position in cricket

Square characters and boxes
■, □, ▪, ▫ (Geometric Shapes)
ㅁ, ᆷ, ᄆ (Hangul letter "m")
ロ (Ro (katakana))
口 (Kangxi radical 30, "mouth")
囗 (Kangxi radical 31, "enclosure")
, the symbol of the D'Alembert operator

Other uses
Square (astrological aspect), an aspect of 90 degrees
Square (dessert), a dessert bar with the texture of a firm cake but softer than a cookie
Square (sailing), to adjust the position of the yardarms on a square-rigged vessel to a 90 degree angle with the keel
Square (slang), several meanings
Infantry square, a military tactic used by infantry when threatened by cavalry

See also

 Market Square (disambiguation)
 Old Square, Birmingham
 Public Square (disambiguation)
The Square (disambiguation)
 Town square (disambiguation)